are a kind of Buddhist mummy. In Japan the term refers to the practice of Buddhist monks observing asceticism to the point of death and entering mummification while alive. Mummified monks are seen in a number of Buddhist countries. Only in Japan are they believed to have induced their own death by starvation. Especially in South-Asian countries the monks die through natural causes after which their bodies are mummified.

There is a common suggestion that Shingon school founder Kukai brought this practice from Tang China as part of secret tantric practices he learned. They rather concluded that mummification took place after the demise of the monk practising this kind of asceticism.

Origin 

There is at least one "self-mummified" 550-year-old corpse in existence: that of a Buddhist monk named Sangha Tenzin in a northern Himalayan region of India, visible in a temple in Gue village, Spiti, Himachal Pradesh. This mummy was rediscovered in 1975 when the old stupa preserving it collapsed and it is estimated to be from about the 14th century. The monk was likely a Tibetan dzogpa-chenpo practitioner and similar mummies have been found in Tibet and East Asia. The preservation of the mummy for at least five centuries was possible due to the aridity of the area and cold weather.

According to Paul Williams, the  ascetic practices of Shugendō were likely inspired by Kūkai, the founder of Shingon Buddhism, who ended his life by reducing and then stopping intake of food and water, while continuing to meditate and chant Buddhist mantras. This was considered as evidence of a renunciant bodhisattva.

Japan 
A mountain-dwelling religion called Shugendō emerged in Japan as a syncretism between Vajrayana Buddhism, Shinto and Taoism in the 7th century, which stressed ascetic practices. This practice was perfected over a period of time, particularly in the Three Mountains of Dewa region of Japan, that is the Haguro, Gassan and Yudono mountains. These mountains remain sacred in the Shugendō tradition to this day, and ascetic austerities continue to be performed in the valleys and mountain range in this area.

It involved a strict diet called  (literally). The diet abstained from any cereals, and relied on pine needles, resins and seeds found in the mountains, which would eliminate all fat in the body. Increasing rates of fasting and meditation would lead to starvation. The monks would slowly reduce then stop liquid intake, thus dehydrating the body and shrinking all organs. Many Buddhist  mummies have been found in northern Japan and estimated to be centuries old, while texts suggest that hundreds of these cases are buried in the stupas and mountains of Japan. These mummies have been revered and venerated by the laypeople of Buddhism.

One of the altars in the Honmyō-ji temple of Yamagata prefecture continues to preserve one of the oldest mummies—that of the  ascetic named Honmyōkai. This process of self-mummification was mainly practiced in Yamagata in Northern Japan between the 11th and 19th century, by members of the Japanese Vajrayana school of Buddhism called Shingon ("True Word"). The practitioners of  did not view this practice as an act of suicide, but rather as a form of further enlightenment.

Emperor Meiji banned this practice in 1879, and assisted suicide—including religious suicide—is now illegal.

In popular culture 
 The practice was satirized in the story "The Destiny That Spanned Two Lifetimes" by Ueda Akinari, in which such a monk was found centuries later and resuscitated. The story appears in the collection .
 The practice is also extensively referenced in Japanese author Haruki Murakami's 2017 novel Killing Commendatore.
 In Rumiko Takahashi's series InuYasha, a priest named Hakushin was a "living mummy" who sacrificed himself via sokushinbutsu to save the people he served.
 Self-mummification is the subject of the 1990 horror story "Unbearable maze" by manga artist Junji Ito. This story was animated in the 2023 anime series "Junji Ito Maniac: Japanese Tales of the Macabre".

See also 
 Immured anchorite
 Incorruptibility
 Prayopavesa: A parallel practice in Hinduism
 Rainbow body
 Sallekhana: A parallel practice in Jainism
 Embalming
 Plastination

References

Further reading
 
 Hijikata, M. (1996). Nihon no Miira Butsu wo Tazunete. [Visiting Japanese Buddhist Mummies]. Tokyo: Shinbunsha.
 Jeremiah, K. (2009). Corpses: Tales from the crypt. Kansai Time Out, 387, 8–10.
 
 Matsumoto, A. (2002). Nihon no Miira Butsu. [Japanese Buddhist Mummies]. Tokyo: Rokkō Shuppan.
 Raveri, M. (1992). Il corpo e il paradiso: Le tentazioni estreme dell’ascesi. [The Body and Paradise: Extreme Practices of Ascetics]. Venice, Italy: Saggi Marsilio Editori.
 The Japanese Art of Self-Preservation Erika Nesvold 30 November 2015

External links 
 Daruma Forums – photos and descriptions of travelling to see Sokushinbutsu
 Pictures of self-mummified monks.
 

Mummies
Shingon Buddhism
Vajrayana
Suicide types
Suicides by starvation
Suicides in Japan
Death in Japan
Religion and suicide
Shugendō
Buddhist relics
Buddhist asceticism
Buddhism and death